Isna River is a river in Portugal.
The river's source begins South of Casalinho and then passes South West past the villages/towns of Atalaia, Cardal Pequeno, Fernandaires and Trisio before it leads into the Zêzere River.

References

Rivers of Portugal